Ibraheem Olalekan Jabaar (born 24 October 2002) is a Nigerian footballer who plays as a winger for South African Premier Division club Stellenbosch.

Club career
After playing for Ijebu United and Olisa in Nigeria, Jabaar signed for Stellenbosch of the South African Premier Division in February 2021 on a contract of an undisclosed length. He made his debut for the club on 21 February 2021 in a 1–0 defeat away to Tshakhuma Tsha Madzivhandila.

International career
Jabaar has played for the Nigeria national under-17 team at the 2019 FIFA U-17 World Cup and the 2019 Africa U-17 Cup of Nations.

References

External links
 

Living people
2002 births
Nigerian footballers
Nigeria youth international footballers
Association football wingers
Stellenbosch F.C. players
South African Premier Division players